Stratified cuboidal epithelium is a type of epithelial tissue composed of multiple layers of cube-shaped cells. Only the most superficial layer is made up of cuboidal cells, and the other layers can be cells of other types. Topmost layer of skin epidermis in frogs, fish is made up of living cuboidal cells.

Structure
This type of tissue can be observed in sweat glands, mammary glands, circumanal glands, and salivary glands. They protect areas such as the ducts of sweat glands, mammary glands, and salivary glands. They are also observed in the linings of urethra.

References

External links
 Overview at umdnj.edu
  "Sweat Duct" (Stratified cuboidal)
  - "Skin"

Epithelium